Vladimir Nikolayevich Pantyushenko (born 15 December 1975) is a former Russian professional football player.

Honours
 Russian Second Division Zone Ural top scorer: 2002 (18 goals).

External links
 

1975 births
Sportspeople from Dushanbe
Living people
Russian footballers
Association football forwards
FC Kuban Krasnodar players
FC Rubin Kazan players
FC Yugra Nizhnevartovsk players
FC Sibir Novosibirsk players
FC Sodovik Sterlitamak players
FC Taraz players
Kazakhstan Premier League players
Russian expatriate footballers
Expatriate footballers in Kazakhstan
Russian expatriate sportspeople in Kazakhstan